Robert Fairfax, 7th Lord Fairfax of Cameron MP (1707–1793), was a member of the Scottish peerage and politician. He died at Leeds Castle, England, which he inherited from his mother Catherine, daughter of Thomas Culpeper, 2nd Baron Culpeper of Thoresway.

He was a younger son of Thomas Fairfax, 5th Lord Fairfax of Cameron, and Catherine Colepeper (or Culpeper). Robert gained the rank of major in the service of the 1st Troop of Horse Guards. He held the office of Member of Parliament (MP) for Maidstone from 1740 to 1741 and from 1747 to 1754. He also was the MP for Kent between 1754 and 1768. Robert married Martha Collins, daughter of Anthony Collins, on 25 April 1741. He later married, Dorothy Best, daughter of Mawdisty Best and Elizabeth Fearne, on 15 July 1749.

His title and immense domain, which he inherited in 1781, consisting of 5,282,000 acres (21,380 km2), was in possession of his elder brother, Thomas Fairfax, 6th Lord Fairfax of Cameron, during the American Revolutionary War, but it was confiscated during the hostilities by the Virginia Act of 1779. Robert Fairfax was awarded £13,758 in 1792, by Act of Parliament for the relief of American Loyalists.

Robert died on 15 July 1793 without an heir so the Cameron title was left in abeyance. His cousin, Bryan Fairfax, 8th Lord Fairfax of Cameron, visited London in 1798 and claimed the title (although he never actually used the title once it was granted to him). He lived in the United States where he was a priest of the Episcopal Church, and also a neighbor and friend of George Washington.

Ancestry

See also 
 Lord Fairfax of Cameron

References

External links
 Culpepper Connections! The Culpepper Family History Site 

1707 births
1793 deaths
Culpeper family
Robert
18th-century English people
Lords Fairfax of Cameron